Tomáš Fryšták (born 18 August 1987) is a Czech footballer who plays for Slovácko as a goalkeeper.

Club career

FK Senica
Fryšták made his Fortuna Liga debut for Senica against Žilina on 8 August 2020.

AS Trenčín
Tomáš made his debut for AS Trenčín against Zemplín Michalovce on 7 August 2021. Trenčín won 2:1.

References

External links
 AS Trenčín official club profile 
 
 Futbalnet profile 
 

1987 births
Living people
People from Uherské Hradiště
Czech footballers
Czech expatriate footballers
Association football goalkeepers
1. FC Slovácko players
FK Čáslav players
FC Silon Táborsko players
SK Dynamo České Budějovice players
Bohemians 1905 players
FK Baník Sokolov players
FK Senica players
AS Trenčín players
Czech First League players
Czech National Football League players
Slovak Super Liga players
Expatriate footballers in Slovakia
Czech expatriate sportspeople in Slovakia
Sportspeople from the Zlín Region